Mujo is a Serbo-Croatian hypocorism of either Mustafa or Muhamed.

Mujo may also refer to:

People
 Mujo Muković (born 1963), Serbian politician from the country's Bosniak community
 Mujo Sočica (died 1941), Montenegrin and Serbian politician and lawyer
 Mujo Ulqinaku (1896–1939), Albanian sergeant
 Yllka Mujo (born 1953), Albanian actress

Other
 Mujo (film)
 Mujō, Japanese name for impermanence